Daniel Nestor and Nenad Zimonjić were the defending champions, but Nestor chose not to participate that year.
Zimonjić played with Michaël Llodra and reached the final, but lost to Jürgen Melzer and Philipp Petzschner, 6–4, 3–6, [10–5].

Seeds

Draw

Draw

External links
 2011 ABN AMRO World Tennis Tournament Main Doubles Draw

Doubles